Bukor is a village in the municipality of Šabac, Serbia. Its population dropped from 818 in 2002 to 620 in 2011.

According to the 2011 census the average age in the village is 46.8.

References

Populated places in Mačva District